The piña colada ("pineapple", and  , "strained") is a  cocktail made with rum, cream of coconut or coconut milk, and pineapple juice, usually served either blended or shaken with ice. It may be garnished with either a pineapple wedge, maraschino cherry, or both.
The drink originated in Puerto Rico.

Etymology 
The name piña colada (Spanish) literally means "strained pineapple", a reference to the freshly pressed and strained pineapple juice used in the drink's preparation.

History 

The earliest known story states that in the 19th century, Puerto Rican pirate Roberto Cofresí, to boost his crew's morale, gave them a beverage or cocktail that contained coconut, pineapple and white rum. This was what would be later known as the famous piña colada. With his death in 1825, the recipe for the piña colada was lost. Historian Haydée Reichard disputes this version of the story.

A recipe for a 'pina colada' is included in the 'Savoy Cocktail Book' by Harry Craddock, published in 1930. This recipe includes white rum, coconut milk and crushed pineapple blended with ice. 

In 1950, The New York Times reported that "Drinks in the West Indies range from Martinique's famous rum punch to Cuba's pina colada (rum, pineapple and coconut milk)."

The Caribe Hilton Hotel claims Ramón "Monchito" Marrero created the Piña Colada in 1954 while a bartender at the hotel. According to this account, Marrero finally settled upon the recipe for the Piña Colada, which he felt captured the true nature and essence of Puerto Rico. The hotel was presented with a proclamation in 2004 by Puerto Rico Governor Sila M. Calderón celebrating the drink's 50th anniversary.

Barrachina, a restaurant in Puerto Rico, says that "a traditional Spanish bartender Don Ramon Portas Mingot in 1963 created what became the world's famous drink: the Piña Colada."

In 1978, Puerto Rico proclaimed the cocktail to be its official drink.

Preparation 

As recounted by his friends in José L. Díaz de Villegas's book, the original Monchito recipe was to pour 85 grams of cream of coconut, 170 grams of pineapple juice and 43 grams of white rum into a blender or shaker with crushed ice, blend or shake very well until smooth, then pour into chilled glass and garnish with pineapple wedge and/or a maraschino cherry.

There are many recipes for piña colada. The International Bartenders Association specifies it as:
Ingredients
 (5 parts)  white rum
 (3 parts)  coconut cream
 (5 parts)  pineapple juice

Method
Mix with crushed ice in blender until smooth, then pour into a chilled glass, garnish and serve. Alternately, the three main components can simply be added to a cocktail glass with ice cubes.

In San Juan, Puerto Rico a recipe used is:
Ingredients
  heavy cream
  frozen freshly pressed pineapple juice
  cream of coconut
  rum
Method
Freeze pineapple juice before use. In a blender, combine cream of coconut, frozen pineapple juice, heavy cream and rum. Pour in a desired 12-ounce container and use a cherry and fresh pineapple for a garnish.

Variations 
Different proportions of the core ingredients, as well as different types of rum, may all be used in the piña colada. Frozen piña coladas are also served. Other named variations include:

 Amaretto colada – with additional amaretto and heavy cream.
 Angostura colada – with additional angostura bitters, lime juice, topped with whipped cream.
 Chi chi – with vodka substituted for rum.
 Lava Flow or Miami Vice – strawberry daiquiri and piña colada layered in one glass.
 Virgin piña colada or piñita colada – without the rum, thus non-alcoholic.
 Kiwi colada – with kiwifruit (fruit and syrup) in place of pineapple juice.
 Soda colada – resembles original recipe but soda is used instead of coconut milk
 Kahlua colada – substitute Kahlua (coffee liqueur) for rum.
 Scotsman colada – substitute Scotch for rum.
 Staten Island Ferry – a cocktail consisting of equal parts Malibu (flavored rum) and pineapple juice served over ice. In flavor it resembles a Piña Colada (due to the coconut flavor of Malibu rum). As it does not require cream of coconut, it is thus more easily prepared in bars that lack the specialty ingredients and blender that a Piña Colada would typically require.
 Caribou Lou – 1 oz of Malibu rum, 1.5 oz of 151 Proof Rum, and 5 oz of Pineapple Juice. Very strong.
 Blue Hawaiian – differs from a piña colada mainly by including blue Curaçao.
 Tequila colada – made by substituting tequila for rum.
 Tepache colada – a piña colada variation using tepache developed by JungleBird in Santurce, Puerto Rico. Recipe calls for 1.5 oz Gold Rum, 2 o oz Tepache and 1.5 oz Coconut Cream.

In popular culture 
In the United States, National Piña Colada Day is celebrated on 10 July.

The 10cc band refer to the drink in the song "Dreadlock Holiday" (it is styled on the lyric sheet as "Sinking pena calarta")

Steely Dan refer to a piña colada in the lyrics of their 1975 song "Bad Sneakers," from their album Katy Lied: "Bad sneakers and a piña colada, my friend."  
 
The cocktail gained worldwide fame after Rupert Holmes released his 1979 song "Escape (The Piña Colada Song)", which became a popular hit around the world.

Jazz and flugelhorn player Chuck Mangione likewise released a tune titled "Piña Colada" on his 1979 album Fun and Games.

The cocktail serves as part of the title of the Garth Brooks song "Two Piña Coladas".

See also 

 Coco López
 Ramón López Irizarry

References

External links 

Caribbean drinks
Cocktails with coconut
Cocktails with pineapple juice
Cocktails with rum
Creamy cocktails
Fruity cocktails
Puerto Rican cuisine
Sweet cocktails
Three-ingredient cocktails